Meryta choristantha is a species of plant in the family Araliaceae. It is endemic to French Polynesia.

References

Flora of French Polynesia
chlorisantha
Vulnerable plants
Taxonomy articles created by Polbot